Emmanouil "Manos" Chatzidakis (alternate spelling: Manos, Manolis, Hatzidakis, Hadjidakis) (born April 21, 2000) is a Greek professional basketball player for Kolossos Rodou of the Greek Basket League. He is a 2.08 m (6 ft 10½ in) tall center.

Youth career
Chatzidakis played from a young age with the youth teams of Kronos Agios Dimitrios, Ikaros Kallitheas and Panionios Leros before he started his pro career.

Professional career
On June 28, 2016, Chatzidakis moved to AEK Athens of the Greek League, where he signed a seven-year contract. On September 20, 2018, AEK loaned him to Maroussi of the Greek A2 League in order to get more playing time. In his first game, he recorded 20 points, 7 rebounds, and 3 assists against Kavala. During the 2020-21 season with Maroussi, Chatzidakis averaged 9.1 poins and 4 rebounds per contest, in 22 games. 

On July 9, 2021, Chatzidakis signed with Kolossos Rodou. In 24 games, he averaged 3.2 points and 1.4 rebounds, playing around 9 minutes per contest. On August 16, 2022, he renewed his contract with Kolossos for another two years.

References

External links
FIBA Profile (archive)
Eurobasket.com Profile

2000 births
Living people
AEK B.C. players
Centers (basketball)
Greek men's basketball players
Greek Basket League players
Kolossos Rodou B.C. players
Koroivos B.C. players
Maroussi B.C. players
People from Leros
21st-century Greek people